is a Japanese Flash animation created by former Shimane Prefecture resident Ryo Ono (FROGMAN) and produced by DLE. The series turns the classic superhero formula on its head, making the ostensibly “evil” team of villains the protagonists of the story, and the traditional superhero of the series, Deluxe Fighter, a narcissistic and largely incapable bully.

Plot
Eagle Talon is a secret society based in Kojimachi, Tokyo.  Each episode follows Eagle Talon's attempts (and subsequent failures) to take over the world.

Characters

The leader of Secret Society Eagle Talon. The Chancellor is the 55-year-old straight man of the team, and created Eagle Talon hoping to conquer the world and bring about lasting, global peace also similar-ripoff of M. Bison from Street Fighter.

Yoshida is the 24-year-old Lieutenant of Eagle Talon, although he is depicted as perpetually looking and sounding like a small boy. Yoshida is kind-hearted but irresponsible and childish, and he is frequently the reason the group’s plans fail.

Phillip is a former heavy metal vocalist and a surprisingly savvy businessman who joins Eagle Talon as a contract employee. Despite his ferocious appearance, he is, in fact, the group’s most timid member.

Doctor Leonardo is a genius scientist and inventor that looks like a teddy bear and is responsible for building most of the tools Eagle Talon employs in its plans for world domination. Doctor Leonardo invented the Monster Machine, a device introduced early in the series that combines living beings and everyday items to create various monsters. The Monster Machine frequently makes recurring appearances in the series.

Creepy Kid is a small, purple-skinned boy. Little is known about his origins, but when threatened, the usually timid Creepy Kid can summon earth-shattering psychic powers.

Ostensibly a superhero, Deluxe Fighter is the super-powered nemesis of Eagle Talon. Narcissistic and cowardly, Deluxe Fighter is largely devoid of heroic traits. His special move is the “Deluxe Bomber,” an energy beam that Deluxe Fighter can shoot from the palm of his hand. 
Many episodes in the series end with Deluxe Fighter decimating the Eagle Talon team with the Deluxe Bomber, causing a comically large explosion in the middle of Tokyo.

Reception
Secret Society Eagle Talons popularity in its native Japan is well documented. Originally conceived in 2006 as part of Frogman’s “The Frogman Show” animation block on TV Asahi, the Eagle Talon franchise has expanded into a nationally recognized property, spanning six seasons, one short film, two spinoff series, eight feature-length films (including a crossover with DC Entertainment's Justice League), a number of mobile games hosted on the popular Gree and Mobage platforms, merchandise and more. 
Additionally, Eagle Talons characters have been licensed for promotional campaigns. Japan Rail, Toho Cinemas, Toys 'R' Us, Capcom, Sanrio, NTT Docomo, Hulu Japan and a number of other Japanese and International businesses have promoted their products and services with Eagle Talons characters.

References

External links
Official anime website 

2006 anime television series debuts
2009 anime television series debuts
2012 anime television series debuts
Anime with original screenplays
2013 short films
Anime film and television articles using incorrect naming style
Anime short films
Muse Communication